Titanium fluoride can refer to
Titanium(III) fluoride (titanium trifluoride, TiF3), a violet to purple-red solid
Titanium(IV) fluoride (titanium tetrafluoride, TiF4), a white hygroscopic solid with polymeric structure

Titanium compounds